Hasanabad-e Sar Kal (also Romanized as Ḩasanābād-e Sar Kal; also known as Ḩasanābād) is a village in Shusef Rural District, Shusef District, Nehbandan County, South Khorasan Province, Iran. At the 2006 census, its population was 100, in 21 families.

References 

Populated places in Nehbandan County